Jason Kutney (born September 5, 1981 in Freehold Borough, New Jersey) is an American soccer player who formerly played for the Pittsburgh Riverhounds in the USL Professional Division.

Career

College and amateur
Raised in Freehold Borough, New Jersey, Kutney graduated from Freehold High School in 2000 and played college soccer for the Duquesne Dukes men's soccer team from 2000 to 2003, where he was a 2002-2004 COSIDA-Verizon Academic All-American, a 2003-2004 adidas All-American (Atlantic Region 1st Team), Duquesne's Male Athlete of the Year in 2003-2004, and graduated with a degree in Finance and Investment Management.

During his college years he also played with Jersey Shore Boca in the USL Premier Development League.

Professional
Kutney turned professional in 2004 when he signed with Charleston Battery, and spent two years in South Carolina before transferring to the Pittsburgh Riverhounds in the USL Second Division.

He returned to the Riverhounds in 2008 after the team's hiatus year not only as a player, but as part of the new ownership group leading pro soccer into the future in Pittsburgh. Kutney additionally serves as the team's Director of Youth Soccer Development.

References

External links
Riverhounds bio
Duquesne bio

USL Second Division players
USL League Two players
USL Championship players
1981 births
Living people
American soccer players
Charleston Battery players
Duquesne Dukes men's soccer players
Freehold High School alumni
Jersey Shore Boca players
People from Freehold Borough, New Jersey
Pittsburgh Riverhounds SC players
USL First Division players
Soccer players from New Jersey
Sportspeople from Monmouth County, New Jersey
Association football midfielders